Abu Musa Muhammad ibn Harun al-Rashid (April 787 – 24/25 September 813), better known by his Regnal name of al-Amin, was the sixth Arab Abbasid caliph from 809 to 813. 

Al-Amin succeeded his father, Harun al-Rashid, in 809 and ruled until he was deposed and killed in 813, during the civil war by his half-brother, al-Ma'mun.

Early life and the issue of succession
Muhammad, the future al-Amin, was born in April 787 to the Abbasid caliph Harun al-Rashid and Zubayda, herself descended from the second Abbasid caliph, al-Mansur.
 

Muhammad had an elder half-brother, Abdallah, the future al-Ma'mun, who had been born in September 786. However, Abdallah's mother was a Persian slave concubine, and his pure Abbasid lineage gave Muhammad seniority over his half-brother. Indeed, he was the only Abbasid caliph to claim such descent. Already in 792, Harun had Muhammad receive the oath of allegiance (bay'ah) with the name of al-Amīn ("The Trustworthy"), effectively marking him out as his main heir, while Abdallah was not named second heir, under the name al-Maʾmūn ("The Trusted One") until 799. Both brothers were assigned members of the powerful Barmakid family as tutors: al-Amin's tutor was al-Fadl ibn Yahya, while al-Ma'mun's was Ja'far ibn Yahya.

These arrangements were confirmed and publicly proclaimed in 802, when Harun and the most powerful officials of the Abbasid government made the pilgrimage to Mecca. Al-Amin would succeed Harun in Baghdad, but al-Ma'mun would remain al-Amin's heir and would additionally rule over an enlarged Khurasan. This was an appointment of particular significance, as Khurasan had been the starting-point of the Abbasid Revolution which brought the Abbasids to power, and retained a privileged position among the Caliphate's provinces. Furthermore, the Abbasid dynasty relied heavily on Khurasanis as military leaders and administrators. Many of the original Khurasani Arab army (Khurasaniyya) that came west with the Abbasids were given estates in Iraq and the new Abbasid capital, Baghdad, and became an elite group known as the abnāʾ al-dawla ("sons of the state/dynasty"). This large-scale presence of an Iranian element in the highest circles of the Abbasid state, with the Barmakid family as its most notable representatives, was certainly a factor in the appointment of al-Ma'mun, linked through his mother with the eastern Iranian provinces, as heir and governor of Khurasan. The stipulations of the agreement, which were recorded in detail by the historian al-Tabari, accorded al-Mamun's Khurasani viceroyalty extensive autonomy. However, modern historians consider that these accounts may have been distorted by later apologists of al-Ma'mun in the latter's favour. Harun's third heir, al-Mu'tamin, received responsibility over the frontier areas with the Byzantine Empire in Upper Mesopotamia and Syria. 

These complex arrangements, sealed with mutual judicial and religious oaths, clearly demonstrate that Harun was conscious of their precariousness, in view of the profound differences between al-Amin and al-Ma'mun, both in character and in interests. Very quickly, this latent rivalry had important repercussions: almost immediately after the court returned to Baghdad in January 803, the Abbasid elites were shaken by the abrupt fall of the Barmakid family from power. On the one hand, this event may reflect the fact that the Barmakids had become indeed too powerful for the Caliph's liking, but its timing suggests that it was tied to the succession issue as well: with al-Amin siding with the abnāʾ and al-Ma'mun with the Barmakids, and the two camps becoming more estranged every day, if al-Amin was to have a chance to succeed, the power of the Barmakids had to be broken. Indeed, the years after the fall of the Barmakids saw an increasing centralization of the administration and the concomitant rise of the influence of the abnāʾ, many of whom were now dispatched to take up positions as provincial governors and bring these provinces under closer control from Baghdad. This led to unrest in the provinces, especially Khurasan, where local elites had a long-standing rivalry with the abnāʾ and their tendency to control of the province (and its revenues) from Iraq. The harsh taxation imposed by a prominent member of the abnāʾ, Ali ibn Isa ibn Mahan, even led to a revolt under Rafi ibn al-Layth, which eventually forced Harun himself, accompanied by al-Ma'mun and the powerful chamberlain (hajib) and chief minister al-Fadl ibn al-Rabi, to travel to the province in 808. Al-Ma'mun was sent ahead with part of the army to Marv, while Harun stayed at Tus, where he died on 24 March 809.

Caliphate
When Harun al-Rashid died in March 809. (Harun had dismissed Ali and replaced him with Harthama ibn A'yan, and in 808 marched himself east to deal with the rebel Rafi ibn al-Layth, but died in March 809 while at Tus). Al-Amin smoothly succeeded him. The majority of army commanders on the Khorasan expedition decided to obey new caliph's order to return to Baghdad. The rebel chose to surrender himself to Harun's son and new governor of Khurasan, al-Ma'mun. He was pardoned, and nothing more is known of him after. Al-Amin continued the progressive moves of his father. The first two years of his reign were generally peaceful.

Hostility towards al-Mamun
Al-Ma'mun had mistrusted al-Amin before their father's death and convinced Harun to take him with him on Harun's last journey east. Although Harun had instructed the Baghdad commanders of this expedition to remain with al-Ma'mun, after Harun's death they returned to Baghdad. Al-Amin sought to turn al-Ma'mun's financial agent in Rayy against al-Ma'mun and he ordered al-Ma'mun to acknowledge al-Amin's son Musa as heir and return to Baghdad. Al-Ma'mun replaced his agent in Rayy and refused the orders. His mother was Persian and he had strong support in Iran.

The brothers had different mothers. Al-Amin was prompted to move against al-Ma'mun by meddlesome ministers, especially al-Fadl ibn al-Rabi'. He had Harun's succession documents brought from Mecca to Baghdad, where he destroyed them. Then, he sent agents east to stir opposition to al-Ma'mun. However, a careful watch at the frontier denied them the opportunity. Al-Amin denied al-Ma'mun's request for his family and money and kept them in Baghdad.

Internal rebellions
Al-Amin faced unrest in Syria. He sent Abd al-Malik ibn Salih to restore order there. There was fierce fighting and Abd al-Malik died. Al-Amin sent Ahmad ibn Mazyad and Abdallah ibn Humayd east, each with an army (al-Tabari v. 31 p. 100 says each had 20,000 men). However, Tahir's agents sowed discord and these two armies fought against each other.

Al-Amin faced an uprising in Baghdad led by Ali ibn Isa's son Husayn. This was quelled and Husayn was killed.

Civil war (811–813)

Under the influence of their respective ministers, al-Amin and al-Ma'mun took steps that further polarized the political climate and made the breach irreparable. After al-Ma'mun symbolically removed al-Amin's name from his coins and from the Friday prayer, in November 810 al-Amin removed al-Ma'mun and al-Mu'tamin from the succession and nominated his own sons Musa and Abdallah instead. Al-Ma'mun replied by declaring himself imam, a religious title which shied of directly challenging the Caliph but nevertheless implied independent authority, as well as hearkening back to the early days of the Hashimiyya movement which had carried the Abbasids to power.

Despite the reservations of some of his senior ministers and governors, two months later, in January 811, al-Amin formally began the civil war when he appointed Ali ibn Isa governor of Khurasan, placed him at the head of an unusually large army of 40,000 men, drawn from the abnaʾ, and sent him to depose al-Ma'mun. When Ali ibn Isa set out for Khurasan, he reportedly took along a set of silver chains with which to bind al-Ma'mun and carry him back to Baghdad.

In March 811 al-Amin dispatched an army under Ali ibn Isa ibn Mahan against al-Ma'mun. Ali advanced on Rayy. Al-Ma'mun's capable general Tahir bin Husain met and defeated Ali, who was killed.

Tahir took Ahwaz and gained control of Bahrayn and parts of Arabia. Basra and Kufa swore allegiance to al-Ma'mun. Tahir advanced on Baghdad and defeated a force sent against him. In Mecca, Dawud ibn Isa reminded worshippers that al-Amin had destroyed Harun ar Rashid's succession pledges and led them in swearing allegiance to al-Mamun. Dawud then went to Marv and presented himself to al-Ma'mun. Al-Ma'mun confirmed Dawud in his governorship of Mecca and Medina.

Family
Al-Amin is recorded as having had two wives, Arib al-Ma'muniyya, and Lubana bint Ali ibn al-Mahdi (who was noted for her exceptional beauty). However, al-Amin died before the consummation of his marriage to Lubanah; her attested poetry includes a lament for his death: 'Oh hero lying dead in the open, betrayed by his commanders and guards. I cry over you not for the loss of my comfort and companionship, but for your spear, your horse and your dreams. I cry over my lord who widowed me before our wedding night'.
Children
 Musa ibn Muhammad al-Amin, he was his elder son and al-Amin tried to nominate him as heir.
 Abdallah ibn Muhammad al-Amin, was the second son of al-Amin.

Death

In 812, Tahir advanced and set up camp near Baghdad's Anbar Gate and besieged the city. The effects of this siege were made more intense by the rampaging prisoners who broke out of jail. There were several vicious battles, such as at al-Amin's palace of Qasr Halih, at Darb al- Hijarah and the al-Shammasiyyah Gate. In that last one Tahir led reinforcements to regain positions lost by another officer. Overall the situation was worsening for al-Amin and he became depressed.

When Tahir pushed into the city, al-Amin sought to negotiate safe passage out. Tahir reluctantly agreed on the condition al-Amin turn over his sceptre, seal and other symbols of office. Al-Amin tried to leave on a boat, apparently with these symbols, rejecting warnings to wait. However, Tahir noticed the boat, and al-Amin was thrown into the water, swam to shore, was captured and then brought to a room, where he was executed. His head was placed on the Anbar Gate. Al-Tabari (v. 31 pp. 197–202) quotes Tahir's letter to al-Ma'mun informing him of al-Amin's capture and execution and the state of peace resulting in Baghdad.

When al-Amin was killed, one of Zubaidah's eunuchs came to her and appealed to her to seek vengeance for al-Amin's blood as Aisha sought vengeance for the blood of Uthman (According to Eunuch's view). Zubaida, however, refused to do so. As al-Ma'mun refused to acknowledge al-Amin's son Musa as heir, the throne went to al-Ma'mun.

See also
Abd al-Malik ibn Salih Abbasid Arab military General
Ali ibn Isa ibn Mahan 779/80 – 3 July 811) Abbasid Iranian military general in the late 8th and early 9th centuries.
Sulayman ibn Abi Ja'far, great uncle, governor and important aide of al-Amin

References

Sources
 
 
 
 
 
 

787 births
813 deaths
Arab Muslims
Fourth Fitna
8th-century people from the Abbasid Caliphate
9th-century rulers in Africa
9th-century Abbasid caliphs
9th-century executions by the Abbasid Caliphate
9th-century murdered monarchs
Assassinated caliphs
One Thousand and One Nights characters
Sons of Harun al-Rashid
8th-century Arabs
9th-century Arabs